The Last Metro (French: Dernier métro) is a 1945 French crime film directed by Maurice de Canonge and starring Gaby Morlay, Alexandre Rignault and Mony Dalmès. It was based on the 1912 novel Mathilde et ses mitaines by Tristan Bernard.

The film's sets were designed by the art director Claude Bouxin. It recorded admissions in France of 2,218,391.

Synopsis
Leaving the station after having caught the last Paris Metro, a man comes to the rescue of a woman who is being assaulted and finds himself drawn into her affairs.

Cast

References

Bibliography
 Goble, Alan. The Complete Index to Literary Sources in Film. Walter de Gruyter, 1999.

External links
The Last Metro at IMDb

1945 films
French crime films
1945 crime films
1940s French-language films
French black-and-white films
Films directed by Maurice de Canonge
Films set in Paris
Films based on French novels
1940s French films